Gerhard VII, Duke of Jülich-Berg ( – 19 August 1475) was the son of William VIII of Jülich, Count of Ravensberg and Adelheid of Tecklenburg.  Gerhard was the second duke of the combined Duchy of Jülich-Berg but the 7th Gerhard in the House of Jülich.

Upon his father's death in 1428, Gerhard became Count of Ravensberg.  In 1437, his uncle Adolf died without heirs and Gerhard inherited his title as Duke of Jülich-Berg.  Gerhard continued his uncle's fight for the dukedom of Guelders, supported by King Albert II of Germany.  In 1444 he won the Battle of Linnich but was unable to prevail in his fight for Guelders and ultimately sold his claim to Burgundy and acquired Blankenheim-Löwenberg and Heinsberg from Guelders.  He was increasingly unable to govern his territories after 1461. His spouse Sophie of Saxe-Lauenburg then wielded regency for him.

Family and children
In 1444, Gerhard married Sophie of Saxe-Lauenburg (1428 – 9 September 1473), daughter of Bernard II, Duke of Saxe-Lauenburg.  They had the following children:

 William (1455–1511), succeeded his father as Duke of Jülich-Berg
 Adolf (1458–1470)
 Gerhard (died young)
 Anna, married John III, Count of Mörs and Saarwerden

References

Ancestors

External links 
 Genealogie-Mittelalter.de

Counts of Ravensberg
Dukes of Jülich
Dukes of Berg
1416 births
1475 deaths
Year of birth uncertain
House of Jülich
Lords of Monschau